Frederick Johns (22 March 1868 – 3 December 1932) was an American-born Australian journalist and biographer.

Johns was  born in Houghton, Michigan, United States, son of Cornishman Ezekiel Johns of Cornwall, UK.  His father Ezekiel died while Fred was still an infant, whereupon he was taken to Cornwall, England. After leaving school, he emigrated to Australia in 1884 at the age of 16. He obtained a position on the South Australian Register and rose to be a sub-editor. In 1906 he published his Johns's Notable Australians, a volume of biographies of Australians then living. A later edition appeared in 1908; from  1912–1914 it appeared as Fred Johns's Annual. In 1922 it was revived as Who's Who in the Commonwealth of Australia , and then in 1927 as Who's Who in Australia. 

In 1914 Johns was appointed a member of the State Hansard staff, of which he subsequently became the leader. In 1920 Johns published a small collection of patriotic verses, In Remembrance, which was followed two years later by A Journalist's Jottings, a collection of essays dealing mostly with well-known Australians. Johns also edited the South Australian Freemason 1920–25.

Johns died at Adelaide aged 64. He was survived by a daughter. Under his will the sum of £1500 was left to the University of Adelaide to found "The Fred Johns Scholarship for Biography". Johns' An Australian Biographical Dictionary was not quite finished at the time of his death. It was completed by his friend B. S. Roach and published by his daughter in 1934, two years after his death. It contains about 3000 short biographies of eminent Australians. His work is marked by great conscientiousness and care, and as a general rule is remarkably accurate.

Footnotes

References
 Johns, Fred, Johns's Notable Australians, and Who is Who in Australasia: A Dictionary of Biography Containing Records of the Careers of Men and Women of Distinction in the Commonwealth of Australia and the Dominion of New Zealand, Fred Johns, (Rose Park, Adelaide), 1908. 

Australian biographers
Male biographers
American emigrants to Australia
American people of Cornish descent
Australian people of Cornish descent
Writers from South Australia
People from Houghton, Michigan
1868 births
1932 deaths
Australian Freemasons